Lawrence E. Imhoff (December 28, 1895 – April 18, 1988) was a soldier, lawyer, and a four-term U.S. Representative from Ohio. He served in Congress from 1933 to 1939 and again from 1941 to 1943.

Early life and career 
Born at Round Bottom, Ohio, Imhoff moved to St. Clairsville, Ohio, in 1907. He attended the rural schools and St. Clairsville High School.

World War I
During the First World War, he enlisted as a private in the Fifth Regiment, United States Marine Corps, and served from August 9, 1917, until honorably discharged on April 1, 1919. He received the Purple Heart Medal.

After the war, Imhoff attended the Ohio State University in Columbus. He served as the clerk of courts for Belmont County, Ohio, from 1921 to 1925. He studied law and was admitted to the bar in January 1930. He served as probate judge of Belmont County 1925–1933.

Congress 
Imhoff was elected as a Democrat to the Seventy-third, Seventy-fourth, and Seventy-fifth Congresses (March 4, 1933 – January 3, 1939). He was an unsuccessful candidate for reelection in 1938 to the Seventy-sixth Congress. He served as special assistant to the United States Attorney General in 1939 and 1940.

Imhoff was again elected to the Seventy-seventh Congress (January 3, 1941 – January 3, 1943).
He was an unsuccessful candidate for reelection in 1942 to the Seventy-eighth Congress.

World War II 
With World War II raging, Imhoff was commissioned as a lieutenant commander in the United States Navy Reserve on January 21, 1943. He was promoted to rank of commander and released from active duty on November 8, 1945.

Later career and death 
He was appointed on November 9, 1945, a member of the Board of Veterans' Appeals, Washington, D.C., and retired December 31, 1964.

He was a resident of North Fort Myers, Florida, until his death there on April 18, 1988.

Sources
 

1895 births
1988 deaths
People from St. Clairsville, Ohio
Ohio State University alumni
Ohio lawyers
United States Marines
United States Marine Corps personnel of World War I
United States Navy personnel of World War II
United States Navy officers
20th-century American politicians
Ohio State University Moritz College of Law alumni
People from North Fort Myers, Florida
20th-century American lawyers
Military personnel from Ohio
Democratic Party members of the United States House of Representatives from Ohio
United States Navy reservists